Laskowo may refer to:

Laskowo, Chodzież County in Greater Poland Voivodeship (west-central Poland)
Laskowo, Żnin County in Kuyavian-Pomeranian Voivodeship (north-central Poland)
Laskowo, Mogilno County in Kuyavian-Pomeranian Voivodeship (north-central Poland)
Laskowo, Oborniki County in Greater Poland Voivodeship (west-central Poland)
Laskowo, Złotów County in Greater Poland Voivodeship (west-central Poland)
Laskowo, Lubusz Voivodeship (west Poland)
Laskowo, West Pomeranian Voivodeship (north-west Poland)